The 1911 North Louth by-election was held on 15 March 1911.  The by-election was held due to the election of the incumbent Irish Parliamentary MP, Richard Hazleton being overturned on petition due to corrupt and defamatory conduct. Hazleton had previously ousted the prominent All-for-Ireland League politician Tim Healy in the December 1910 general election.  It was won by the former MP and Irish Parliamentary candidate Augustine Roche, who was elected unopposed.

References

1911 elections in Ireland
1911 elections in the United Kingdom
By-elections to the Parliament of the United Kingdom in County Louth constituencies
Unopposed by-elections to the Parliament of the United Kingdom (need citation)